The 2007–08 Longwood Lancers men's basketball team represented Longwood University during the 2007–08 NCAA Division I men's basketball season. The team was led by fifth-year head coach Mike Gillian, and played their home games at Willett Hall as a Division I independent school.

Last season
The Lancers had a record of 9–22 in their last season of reclassification from Division II to Division I.

Roster

Schedule 

|-
!colspan=9 style="background:#002B7F; color:#AFAAA3;"| Regular season

References

Longwood Lancers men's basketball seasons
Longwood
Longwood Lancers men's basketball
Long